(John Ernest) Seán Brady (28 May 1890 – 24 February 1969) was an Irish Fianna Fáil politician and businessman who served as a Teachta Dála (TD) for 38 years.

He was first elected to Dáil Éireann at the September 1927 general election for the Dublin County constituency and he held his seat – representing the Dún Laoghaire and Rathdown constituency from 1948 – until losing his seat at the 1965 general election.

References

1890 births
1969 deaths
Fianna Fáil TDs
Members of the 6th Dáil
Members of the 7th Dáil
Members of the 8th Dáil
Members of the 9th Dáil
Members of the 10th Dáil
Members of the 11th Dáil
Members of the 12th Dáil
Members of the 13th Dáil
Members of the 14th Dáil
Members of the 15th Dáil
Members of the 16th Dáil
Members of the 17th Dáil
Politicians from County Dublin